Pagodaturris is a genus of sea snails, marine gastropod mollusks in the family Clavatulidae.

Species
 Pagodaturris molengraaffi (Tesch, 1915)
 Pagodaturris philippinensis Kantor, Fedosov & Puillandre, 2018
 Pagodaturris regilla (Iredale, 1936)

References

 Kantor Yu.I., Fedosov A.E. & Puillandre N. (2018). New and unusual deep-water Conoidea revised with shell, radula and DNA characters. Ruthenica. 28(2): 47-82.